David Gautreaux (born June 28, 1951) is an American stage, television and film actor, perhaps best known for work he never did – the role of Vulcan science officer Xon in the proposed Star Trek: Phase II television series.  When the series was aborted, he was given the role of Commander Branch in Star Trek: The Motion Picture.

Early life
Gautreaux was born in Rhode Island.

Career

He has guest-starred in numerous television series including Man From Atlantis, Search for Tomorrow, One Life to Live, T. J. Hooker, L. A. Law, ER, Rules of Engagement, Boston Legal, and The Beast.  He played recurring roles on Franklin & Bash and Damages.

Star Trek: Phase II

When Paramount Pictures announced plans to make a new Star Trek series in 1977, Leonard Nimoy declined to reprise his role of Spock.  The character of Lieutenant Xon – a 22-year-old full Vulcan officer – was created to fill the void. The series was to premiere in 1978, but the studio decided to instead bring the franchise back as a motion picture. With Nimoy now on board, Gautreaux was given the small role of Commander Branch, leader of Epsilon 9, a space station destroyed by the "V'Ger" cloud early in the film.

Partial filmography
Star Trek: The Motion Picture (1979) - Commander Branch
The Hearse (1980) - Tom Sullivan
Troop Beverly Hills (1989) - Mr. DiBlasio
Animal Instincts II (1994) - Phillip
The Zone (1995) - Rich Hazen
Decaf (1996)
Ghost Whisperer (2007) - Erwin Sembrook

References

External links
 

American male television actors
Star Trek: Phase II
1951 births
Living people
20th-century American male actors
American male film actors